George Elvin Walberg (July 27, 1896 – October 27, 1978) was an American professional baseball player. He played in Major League Baseball as a left-handed pitcher from  through , most notably as a member of the Philadelphia Athletics dynasty that won three consecutive American League pennants from 1929 to 1931, along with the World Series in 1929 and 1930. Walberg also pitched for the New York Giants and the Boston Red Sox.

Baseball career
Walberg was born in Pine City, Minnesota. A consistent and durable pitcher, Walberg averaged 16 wins for the Philadelphia Athletics of Connie Mack from 1926 to 1932, with career-highs of 20 wins in 1931 and 18 in 1929. He also had a 1–1 mark with a 1.93 ERA for the Athletics in five World Series appearances. A good-hitting pitcher, Walberg collected a .179 batting average with four home runs and 84 runs batted in. When Mack dismantled the Athletics in 1933, he was sent along with Lefty Grove and Max Bishop to the Boston Red Sox in exchange for two players and $150.000. He was a spot starter and reliever with Boston during three seasons and pitched his last game at the age of 41. 

In a fifteen-season major league career, Walberg posted a 155–141 record with 1085 strikeouts and a 4.16 ERA in 2,644 innings, including 15 shutouts and 140 complete games.
  
Walberg surrendered 17 home runs to Babe Ruth, more than any other pitcher.

Walberg died in Tempe, Arizona at age 82. In , he was inducted into the Philadelphia Baseball Wall of Fame.

External links

1896 births
1978 deaths
People from Pine City, Minnesota
Boston Red Sox players
New York Giants (NL) players
Philadelphia Athletics players
Major League Baseball pitchers
Baseball players from Minnesota
Portland Beavers players
Milwaukee Brewers (minor league) players